The Perlis State Executive Council is the executive authority of the Government of Perlis, Malaysia. The Council comprises the Menteri Besar, appointed by the Raja on the basis that he is able to command a majority in the Perlis State Legislative Assembly, a number of members made up of members of the Assembly, the State Secretary, the State Legal Adviser and the State Financial Officer.

This Council is similar in structure and role to the Cabinet of Malaysia, while being smaller in size. As federal and state responsibilities differ, there are a number of portfolios that differ between the federal and state governments.

Members of the Council are selected by the Menteri Besar, appointed by the Raja. The Council has no ministry, but instead a number of committees; each committee will take care of certain state affairs, activities and departments. Members of the Council are always the chair of a committee.

Lists of full members

Shukri EXCO (since 2022) 

Members since 22 November 2022 have been :

Azlan II EXCO (2018–2022) 

Members from 24 May 2018 to 22 November 2022 were :

Ex officio members

See also 
 Raja of Perlis
 Menteri Besar of Perlis
 Perlis State Legislative Assembly

References

External links 
 Perlis State Government

Politics of Perlis
Perlis